Onurcan Piri (born 28 September 1994), is a Turkish professional footballer who plays as a goalkeeper for Giresunspor, competing at Süper Lig as of 2021–22 season.

Professional career
A youth product of 1957 Espiyespor and Giresunspor, Piri began his career with Giresunspor's senior team in 2013. On 16 October 2014, he transferred to Bursaspor. He followed that up with stints at Çankaya and Çorum before returning to Bursaspor in 2019. On 19 October 2019, he returned to his first club Giresunspor in the TFF First League. He made his Süper Lig debut with Giresunspor in a 1–0 Süper Lig loss to Alanyaspor on 13 September 2021.

International career
Piri is a youth international for Turkey, having represented the Turkey U19s and U21s.

References

External links
 

1994 births
Living people
Sportspeople from Giresun
Turkish footballers
Turkey under-21 international footballers
Turkey youth international footballers
Giresunspor footballers
Süper Lig players
TFF First League players
TFF Second League players
Association football goalkeepers